B&B may refer to:

Common uses
Bed and breakfast, a type of accommodation for travellers

Arts, entertainment, and media

Television

B&B (TV series), an English children's television show
B-And-B, a 1968 British sitcom
B&B: Bella y Bestia, an Argentine sitcom
Beavis and Butt-head, an animated television series
The B&B, an EastEnders spin-off
The Bold and the Beautiful, an American soap opera

Other uses in arts, entertainment, and media
B&B Enterprises, the real estate development company founded by Stringer Bell for the Barksdale Organization, on The Wire
Beerbongs & Bentleys, an album by Post Malone
Bunnies & Burrows, a role-playing game

Brands and enterprises
B&B Hotels, a French hotel chain
B&B Theatres, a midwest cinema chain
Bradford & Bingley, a former British bank, now in public ownership

Other uses
B and B, a liqueur composed of Bénédictine blended with brandy
Branch and bound, a search algorithm